Man or Astro-man? vs. Europa (subtitled "Four Week-Kneed Space Geeks Take on an Entire Continent!") is a Man or Astro-man? 7-inch EP released on Homo-Habilis Records (HH706) in late 1993. It was only pressed on black vinyl, and the turquoise, card-stock picture sleeve folded in such a way as to leave half of the record exposed on the reverse side: The single was made to be sold on their first European tour—a tour titled "Invasion of the Astro-Men!" that lasted from December 14, 1993, to January 11, 1994.

Studio tracks were recorded 10/17/93 at Zero Return studios.

Track listing

Side A
"Popcorn Crabula"
"Intoxica"

Side B
"Squad Car" (live)
"Eric Estrotica" (live)

References

Man or Astro-man? EPs
1993 EPs